Antequera, officially the Municipality of Antequera,  is a 4th class municipality in the province of Bohol, Philippines. According to the 2020 census, it has a population of 14,990 people.

The Mag-Aso falls, whose cascading waters run into natural pools, were greatly altered by the 2013 Bohol earthquake and even more so by flash floods caused by Tropical Storm Seniang in December 2014.

History

The early inhabitants of the area were the Eskaya people, who lived in western Bohol, including the lowlands of Antequera at the present barangay of Viga, from the 7th century until the early 17th century.

Originally the town was a barangay of Maribojoc known as Agad. Migration from surrounding coastal areas increased the population and created many new sitios. On 17 March 1876, the Governor-General of the Philippines signed a decree that made Agad and all its sitios a new municipality. That same year, the governor of the district of Bohol, Joaquin Bengoechia, enacted the law that finalized the boundaries and appointed its first mayor, Simeon Villas. The new municipality was named after the home town in Spain of Bengoechia.

In 1899, the town of Catigbian was abolished, and the barangays of Caimbang, San Isidro, and Causwagan were added to Antequera. But it lost these barangays, along with half of Cansague, when Catigbian was reestablished on 17 June 1949. On 10 January 1970, the municipality of San Isidro was formed, taking the barangays of Cambansag, Abehilan, and Baunos from Antequera.

Geography

Barangays
Antequera comprises 21 barangays:

Climate

Demographics

Economy

The primary economic activities are farming, handicraft or cottage industries (especially basket weaving), and carpentry (including bamboo and wood furniture making). Its main agricultural produce comprises coconut, rice, corn, rootcrops, and vegetables.

Total annual income in 2010 was ₱35,960,730

Government

List of former chief executives
List of former mayors of Antequera:

 Vicente Tambis - 1896–1897
 Julian Calipes - 1909–1911
 Pedro Omila - 1912–1915
 Eufemio Morgia - 1919–1922
 Eustaquio Tambis - 1922–1925
 Eufemio Morgia - 1926–1934
 Luis Gementiza - 1934–1937
 Luis Gementiza - 1938–1940
 Demetrio Jadulco - 1940–1941
 Leoncio Paña - 1943–1945
 Eufemio Morgia - 1944
 Demetrio Jadulco - 1945–1946
 Luis Gementiza - 1946–1951
 Sabino Rebosura - 1952–1963
 Conrad Vallestero - 1963
 Isabelito Tongco - 1964–1992
 Vicente Nunag - 1987–1988
 Arnulfo Labendia - 1992
 Felipe Gementiza - 1992–1998
 Samuel Rebosura - 1998–2007
 Cecelia Rebosura - 2007–2010
 Jose Mario Pahang - 2010–2019
 Lil Nunag - 2019–present

Gallery

References

Sources

External links

 [ Philippine Standard Geographic Code]
Municipality of Antequera

Municipalities of Bohol